Elateia is a settlement of the municipal unit of Makrychori, which belongs to the municipality of Tempi in the Larissa regional unit, Thessaly, Greece.

The Museum of Thessalian Life (Μουσείο Θεσσαλικής Ζωής), is a simulation of an edifice of the Traditional Agricultural Activities and gives the chance to people, to live the experience of the past time.

References

Populated places in Larissa (regional unit)